Saving Kids is an Australian medical documentary television series that screened on Network Ten in 2008. The show was filmed at the Sydney Children's Hospital and presented by singer Damien Leith.

The show follows the stories of children and their families as they go through numerous medical examinations and treatments. Each half hour show follows three children and their stories while in the hospital. The program was broadcast on a Thursday night.

References

External links 
 

Network 10 original programming
2008 Australian television series debuts
2008 Australian television series endings
Australian medical television series
Australian factual television series
Australian television spin-offs
Television shows set in Sydney
Television series about children